San Esteban de los Patos is a municipality located in the province of Ávila, Castile and León, Spain. According to the 2004 census (INE), the municipality has a population of 39 inhabitants.

Notable people
 Blessed Juan María de la Cruz, priest and martyr

References

Municipalities in the Province of Ávila